Chiswell , sometimes , is a small village at the southern end of Chesil Beach, in Underhill, on the Isle of Portland in Dorset. It is the oldest settlement on the island, having formerly been known as Chesilton. The small bay at Chiswell is called Chesil Cove, and the beach promenade and sea wall which form Chiswell's coastal defences are a prominent feature.

The village occupies much of the flat land close to sea level adjacent to the beach, and is distinguished from the adjoining village of Fortuneswell which occupies the steeper hills and streets above. At the northern entrance to the village is the 19th-century development of Victoria Square, which forms a roundabout on the main A354 road onto the island.

As with the other villages and settlements on Portland, Chiswell was designated as a conservation area as part of Underhill in 1976, as it is a place of special architectural and historic interest. The village has been maintained by the Chiswell Community Trust since 2003.

History
Chiswell was established predominantly as a fishing community alongside the pebble bank of Chesil Cove. The settlement dates back to Roman times when it was known as "Coesl". A small tidal creek known as the Mere formerly reached Chiswell, but it progressively silted up as the settlement straddled it expanded. Many of the village's stone and thatched cottages were originally established on the shingle of Chesil Beach.

Despite its vulnerability to sea storms and flooding, Chiswell developed into a thriving community, and by the beginning of the 19th century it had become well established as a "burgeoning centre of trade and exchange". In the 19th century, Chiswell was predominantly inhabited by fishermen, quarrymen, traders and their families and was the island's biggest settlement.

Frequent incidents of flooding were part of village life. One of the best-documented incidents of flooding was the Great Storm of 1824. Chiswell received the full force of the storm, which saw the death of thirty residents, the destruction of eighty houses, and the damage of many others. The damage so extensive that the village never made a full recovery.

Traces of the effect the storm had on the village can be seen today. On the west side of the main street, the house frontages have gaps, some from loss of buildings, but others from purpose-built "opes", a local term used in street names such as Big Ope. These are the locally unique way of providing floodways during storm surges and allowing access to small, rear building groups as well as the beach.

Throughout the 20th century, Chiswell continued to lose its character, and saw further decline. The first half of the 20th century had seen a number of calls for some form of protection from sea flooding. During 1942, the engineers Coode & Partners drew up plans for such measures, but lack of funding had once again stopped any such project from commencing.

The construction of a sea wall finally commenced in 1958, and continued until 1965. The wall extended from the far end of Chesil Cove to the Cove House Inn. As well as providing a new promenade on its top, the wall reduced the risk of flooding in the village and deterred further coastal erosion.

Despite the sea wall, two major storms in December 1978 and February 1979 caused further devastation to Chiswell, leading to the installation of further defence from 1983 to 1986.

In January 1990, Cyclone Daria hit Chesil Cove and the sea overwhelmed the defensive wall causing extensive damage and temporarily closing access to and from the mainland. During January and February 2014, violent storms across southwest England caused more flooding in the village, which received a lot of national and international attention. A hole in the seawall, the gabions and the promenade all had to be repaired, and the flood alleviation channel and the beach itself had to be reprofiled to restore it for any future floods.

Features

The majority of the buildings in the village are now for strictly residential use, with some buildings used for tourism such as in bed and breakfasts and holiday lets, and some commercial premises such as public houses and restaurants. The former United Reformed Church and manse remain a focal point on the main street, despite having closed to congregations in 2009.

The A354 road runs northbound through Chiswell, and at the street's widest point is the village square which now serves as a car parking area. To the east of the main street is a stretch of open, higher ground acting as a buffer that separates Chiswell from Fortuneswell.

The Chiswell Walled Garden was created between 2001 and 2006 by the Chiswell Community Trust within the walls of an old house that remains in ruin. It is maintained by volunteer members of the Trust and is open to the public.

Grade listed features
Chiswell has a wide array of architecture and buildings, a number of which are Grade Listed by Historic England. Some buildings have existed at least in part since the 1600s.

References

External links

 Old Portland pictures from the Steps in Time Archive

Villages in Dorset
Isle of Portland